The Scout Motto of the Scout movement is, in English, "Be Prepared", with most international branches of the group using a close translation of that phrase. These mottoes have been used by millions of Scouts around the world since 1907. Most of the member organizations of the World Association of Girl Guides and Girl Scouts (WAGGGS) share the same mottoes.

In the first part of Scouting for Boys, Robert Baden-Powell explains the meaning of the phrase:

Baden-Powell on "Be Prepared"
Baden-Powell provides several descriptions of how and for what situations a Scout must be prepared elsewhere in Scouting for Boys. In his explanation of the third point of the Scout Law, Baden-Powell says:

In the opening chapter of Scouting for Boys, Baden-Powell says:

Baden-Powell discuses more skills required of Scouts in Chapter IV of Scouting for Boys, which addresses camp life, and he lists:
 Tying knots
 Making a bivouac shelter for the night, or a hut for longer-term camping
 Using an axe or bill-hook to fell small trees and branches
 Mending and even making clothes and boots
 Cooking meat and vegetables, and making bread without regular cooking utensils
 Driving sheep, cattle and horses
 Killing and butchering cattle
 Milking cows or goats

Advice given by Baden-Powell in Chapter V on campaigning includes the requirements of:

 Being able to find one's way by night and by day
 Being able to read a barometer, and signs of the weather
 Judging distance from an inch up to a mile or more
 Knowing the points of a compass

In a chapter discussing endurance, Baden-Powell writes that a scout should be able to:

 Smell well in order to find his enemy by night
 Hear well
 Have good eyesight to notice things rapidly and at distance

In Chapter VII, Baden-Powell discussed how Scouts prepare themselves to protect women and how they can improve themselves. He says a scout should walk with a woman on his left "so that his right is free to protect her", walking on the other side in the streets to protect her from traffic. Baden-Powell adds to "Be Prepared" for the future by learning a trade and saving up pay.

Chapter VIII of Scouting for Boys discussed saving life. On this topic, Baden-Powell says that a scout should be prepared by:

 Learning beforehand what to do in the event of likely accidents
 Being prepared to do what is required the moment that an accident does occur
 Knowing how to deal with a mad dog, and being prepared to take the necessary action
 Knowing how to react to a person's suicide attempt

In the chapter on patriotism, Baden-Powell says to " to die for your country if need be, so that when the moment arrives you may charge home with confidence, not caring whether you are going to be killed or not."

The first handbook for Girl Guides, How Girls Can Help to Build Up the Empire by Agnes and Robert Baden-Powell, similarly explains:

The motto of the Girl Guides is "Be Prepared". Why is this?
It is because, like the other Guides, you have to be prepared at any moment to face difficulties and even dangers by knowing what to do and how to do it.

(The "other Guides" of this quote are the Khyber Guide Regiment.)

Acrostic

Hilary Saint George Saunders' book The Left Handshake: The Boy Scout Movement during the War, 1939–1945 had the first name of each chapter spell out the Scout motto. The chosen names are: Bravery, Enterprise, Purpose, Resolution, Endurance, Partnership, Assurance, Reformation, Enthusiasm and Devotion.

Motto in various languages

Many languages have masculine and feminine forms of words – where gender changes the Scout Motto, differences are reflected here.

{| class="wikitable" style="width: 80%"
|+ style="text-align: center;" | Motto in various languages
|-
! Language
! Countries
! Boy Scouts
! Girl Guides or Girl Scouts
! Organizational variant
! Translation (if other than "Be prepared")
! Transliteration or pronunciation
|-
| Afrikaans
| Namibia, South Africa
| 
|
|
|
|
|-
| Albanian
| Albania
| 
|
| Pergatitu
| "Always prepared"
|
|-
| Amharic
| Ethiopia
| 
|
|
| "Ready"
| 
|-
| Arabic
| Algeria, Bahrain, Egypt, Iraq, Kuwait, Lebanon, Mauritania, Morocco, Oman, Palestinian Authority, Qatar, Saudi Arabia, Sudan, Tunisia, United Arab Emirates, Western Sahara, Yemen
| 
|
| in Jordan, Libya, and Syria 
|
| 
|-
| Armenian
| Armenia
| 
|
| Partsratsir partsratsour
| "Always ready""Elevate yourself and others with you"
| Misht Badrast
|-
| Azeri
| Azerbaijan
| 
|
|
|
|
|-
| Belarusian
| Belarus
| 
|
| 
|
| Budz' hatoǔ!
|-
| Bengali
| Bangladesh
| 
| 
|
| "Do your best to be prepared for service"
| Sebar jannoa sada prastut thakte jathasadhya chesta karaSada prastut
|-
| Bislama
| Vanuatu
| 
|
|
| "Prepare"
|
|-
| Bosnian
| Bosnia and Herzegovina
| 
|
| 
|
|
|-
| Bulgarian
| Bulgaria
| 
| 
|
|
| Bădi gotovBădi gotova
|-
| Burmese
| Burma
| 
|
|
| "Ever ready"
| A-sin-thint
|-
| Cantonese
| Hong Kong, Macau
| 
|
|
| "Prepare"
| Zeon2 bei6
|-
| Chinese (Traditional)
| Taiwan
| 
|
|
| "Prepare"
| Zhǔnbèi
|-
| Catalan
| Andorra, Catalonia, Balearic Islands, Valencia
| 
|
|
| "Always ready"
|
|-
| Chavacano
| Zamboanga
| 
|
|
| "Always prepared!"
|
|-
| Chichewa
| Malawi
| 
|
|
|
|
|-
| Cook Islands Māori
| Cook Islands
|
| 
|
|
|
|-
| Croatian
| Croatia
| 
|
| 
|
|
|-
| Czech
| Czech Republic
| 
| 
|
|
|
|-
| Danish
| Denmark
| 
|
| 
| "Protect and serve!"
|
|-
| Divehi
| Maldives
| 
|
|
|
| Abadhuves thayyarah
|-
| Dutch
| Belgium, the Netherlands, Suriname
| 
|
|  in Belgium,  in the Netherlands,  in Suriname
|
|
|-
| Dzongkha
| Bhutan
| 
|
|
|
| '"Dra drig bay|-
| English
| Australia, Bahamas, Barbados, Belize, Canada, Dominica, The Gambia, Ghana, Grenada, Guyana, Jamaica, Liberia, Namibia, Nigeria, Saint Kitts and Nevis, Saint Lucia, Saint Vincent and the Grenadines, Sierra Leone, Solomon Islands, South Africa, Trinidad and Tobago, United Kingdom, United States, Zambia, Zimbabwe
| Be prepared|
|
|
|
|-
| Esperanto
| (Skolta Esperanto Ligo)
| 
|
|
| 
|
|-
| Estonian
| Estonia
| 
|
|
|
|
|-
| Faroese
| Faroe Islands
| 
|
|
|
|
|-
| Fijian
| Fiji
| 
|
|
|
|
|-
| Filipino
| Philippines
| Laging Handa!
| 
| 
| "Always ready!"
|
|-
| Finnish
| Finland
| 
|
|  (in Swedish)
|
|
|-
| French
| Belgium, Benin, Burkina Faso, Burundi, Cameroon, Canada, Central African Republic, Chad, Democratic Republic of the Congo, Côte d'Ivoire, Republic of the Congo, Equatorial Guinea, France, Gabon, Guinea, Haiti, Madagascar, Mali, Mauritius, Monaco, Morocco, New Caledonia, Rwanda, Seychelles, Switzerland, Togo, Tunisia
| 
| 
|  ("Ready to serve") in Burkina Faso;  ("Be prepared!") widespread;  ("To be prepared") in Haiti and Lebanon;  ("Always straight"/"Always upstanding") in Senegal
| "Always ready!"
| 
|-
| Georgian
| Georgia
| 
|
|
|
| Ikavi mzad|-
| German
| Austria, Germany, Liechtenstein, Namibia, Switzerland
| 
| 
|  in Namibia
| "Always prepared!""As good as I can!"
| 
|-
| Gilbertese
| Kiribati
| 
|
|
|
|
|-
| Greek
| Cyprus, Greece
| 
| 
|
|
| Éso étoimos!Éso étoimi!|-
| Hawaiian
| Hawaii
| 
|
|
|
|
|-
| Modern Hebrew
| Israel
| 
|
|
|
| Heye nachon|-
| Hindi
| India
| 
|
|
| "Prepared"
| Taiyar|-
| Hungarian
| Hungary
| 
|
| 
| "Be watchful!"
|
|-
| Icelandic
| Iceland
| 
|
|
| "Always prepared!"
|
|-
| Indonesian
| Indonesia
| 
|
|
| "My promise becomes my law, my law becomes my devotion"
|
|-
| Interlingua
|
| 
|
|
|
|
|-
| Irish
| Ireland
| 
|
|
|
|
|-
| Italian
| Italy, San Marino, Switzerland
| 
| 
| CNGEI uses  (feminine ) and the Catholic organization AGESCI uses the Latin translation Estote parati from Lc 12,40 and Mt 24,44
|
| 
|-
| Japanese
| Japan
| 
|
|
| "Always be prepared"
| Sonae-yo tsuneni 
|-
| Kazakh
| Kazakhstan
| 
|
|  (in Russian)
|
| Dayyin bol!Bud' gotov!|-
| Kinyarwanda
| Rwanda
| 
|
|
|
|
|-
| Kirundi
| Burundi
| 
|
|
|
|
|-
| Korean
| South Korea
| 
|
|
| "Preparation"
| Junbi|-
| Kyrgyz
| Kyrgyzstan
| 
|
|  (in Russian)
|
| Dayar bolBud' gotov|-
| Khmer
| Cambodia
| 
| 
|
|
| Triam kloun|-
| Lao
| Laos
| 
|
|
| "Prepared"
| 
|-
| Latin
|
| 
| 
| Some Italian associations (usually Catholic) use this form
|
|
|-
| Latvian
| Latvia
| ; response 
| ; response 
|
| "Be watchful""Always watchful!"
|
|-
| Lithuanian
| Lithuania
| ; response 
|
|
|
|
|-
| Luxembourgish
| Luxembourg
| 
|
| 
| "Loyal to the country!"
|
|-
| Macedonian
| North Macedonia
| 
|
|
|
| Bidi podgotven|-
| Malagasy
| Madagascar
| 
|
|
| "Always prepared"
|
|-
| Malay
| Brunei, Malaysia, Singapore
| 
| 
|  in Malaysia
|
|
|-
| Maltese
| Malta
| 
| 
|
|
|
|-
| Mongolian
| Mongolia
| 
| 
|
| "Become prepared!""(I am) ready forever!"
| Belen bol!Hezeed belhen!|-
| Montenegrin
| Montenegro
| 
|
|
|
| Budi spreman|-
| Nepali
| Nepal
| 
|
|
|
| Tayar hou|-
| Netsilik Inuit
| Nunavut
| 
|
|
|
|
|-
| Niuean
| Niue
| 
|
|
|
|
|-
| Norwegian
| Norway
| ; response 
|
|
| "Be prepared!""Always prepared!"
|
|-
| Papiamento
| Aruba, Netherlands Antilles
|  (in Dutch)
|
|  in Netherlands Antilles
|
|
|-
| Pashto
| Afghanistan
| 
|
|
| "Attention"
| Tayar osay|-
| Persian
| Iran
| 
|
|
|
| Âmâdeh bâsh|-
| Polish
| Poland
| 
|
|
| "Watch!" (imp.)
|
|-
| Portuguese
| Angola, Brazil, Cape Verde, Guinea-Bissau, Mozambique, Portugal, São Tomé and Príncipe
| 
|  (in Latin)
|
| "Always alert!"
|
|-
| Romanian
| Moldova, Romania
| 
|
|  in Romania
| "Always ready"
|
|-
| Romansh
| Switzerland
| 
| 
|
|
|
|-
| Russian
| Russia
| 
| 
|
|
| Bud' gotov(a)!|-
| Sakha
| Yakutia
| colspan="2" | 
|
|
| Belem buol!|-
| Samoan
| American Samoa, Samoa
| 
|
|
|
|
|-
| Serbian
| Serbia
| 
|
|
|
| Budi spreman|-
| Sinhala
| Sri Lanka
| 
|
|
|
| 
|-
| Slovakian
| Slovakia
| 
|
|
|
|
|-
| Slovene
| Slovenia
| 
|
| , 
| "Always prepared!""With nature to a better person!"
|
|-
| Somali
| Djibouti, Somalia
| 
|
| 
|
|
|-
| Sotho
| Lesotho
| 
|
|
|
|
|-
| Spanish
| Argentina, Bolivia, Chile, Colombia, Costa Rica*, Cuba, Dominican Republic, Ecuador, El Salvador, Equatorial Guinea*, Guatemala*, Honduras, Mexico, Nicaragua, Panama, Paraguay, Peru, Puerto Rico, Spain, Uruguay, Venezuela
| 
| 
|  ("Well prepared!") in Mexico;  ("Always active!") in Nicaragua,  ("Being prepared!") in Peru and Puerto Rico
| "Always ready (to serve*)!"
| , 
|-
| Sranan Tongo
| Suriname
| 
|
|
|
|
|-
| Swahili
| Comoros, Kenya, Tanzania, Uganda
| 
|
|
|
|
|-
| Swazi
| Swaziland
| 
|
|
|
|
|-
| Swedish
| Sweden
| 
|
|
| "Always prepared!"
|
|-
| Syriac
| Assyria
| 
|
|
| "Always ready"
| Mthoom 'teeda|-
| Tagalog
| Philippines
| 
|
|
| "Always prepared!"
|
|-
| Tahitian
| French Polynesia
| 
|
|
| "Always prepared!"
|
|-
| Tamil
| Sri Lanka
| 
|
|
|
| Thayaar nilayil iru!|-
| Tajik
| Tajikistan
| 
|
|  (in Russian)
|
| Taiyor boshBud' gotov!|-
| Thai
| Thailand
| 
|
|
| "Better to die than to lie"
| Sia chip ya sia sat 
|-
| Tibetan
| Tibet (PRC)
| 
|
|
|
|
|-
| Tok Pisin
| Papua New Guinea
| 
|
|
|
|
|-
| Tongan
| Tonga
| 
|
| 
|
|
|-
| Tswana
| Botswana
| 
| 
|
|
|
|-
| Turkish
| Turkey
| 
|
| , 
| "Always prepared!"
|
|-
| Turkmen
| Turkmenistan
| 
|
| 
| "Always prepared!"
|
|-
| Tuvan
| Tuva
| 
|
|
| "Become prepared!"
| Belen bol!|-
| Urdu
| India, Pakistan
| 
|
| Teyar raho!| "Prepared"
| Almustaid|-
| Ukrainian
| Ukraine
| 
|
|  (an acronym for )
| "With strength! With beauty! With care! With speed!"
| Bud' hotoviy!SKOB!|-
| Uyghur
| Xinjiang (PRC)
| 
|
|
|
| Teyyar bol
|-
| Uzbek
| Uzbekistan
| 
|
|  (in Russian)
|
| Tayyor bo‘lBud' gotov|-
| Vietnamese
| Vietnam
| 
|
|
|
|
|-
| Zarma
| Niger
| 
|
|
| "Get ready"
|
|}

Similar mottoes in other organizations
 The motto of the Young Pioneers, Always prepared in various national languages, the Pioneers having been created as an alternative in countries under Communist rule where Scouting was banned.
The motto of the United States Coast Guard, Semper Paratus or 'ever ready'.
The motto of the British Army's Parachute Regiment, Utrinque Paratus or 'ready for anything'.

Another motto mentioned in Scouting for Boys
In Part IV, Chapter VI of the first edition of Scouting for Boys'', Baden-Powell mentioned another Scout Motto:

See also

Scouting Round the World
Ernst Thälmann Pioneer Organisation#Slogan and greeting

References

Further reading

Mottos
Motto